Jemeppe-sur-Sambre is a municipality of Wallonia located in the province of Namur, Belgium. 

On 1 January 2006, the municipality had 17,990 inhabitants.

The municipality consists of the districts of: Balâtre, Ham-sur-Sambre, Jemeppe-sur-Sambre, Mornimont, Moustier-sur-Sambre, Onoz, Saint-Martin (including the hamlet of Villeret), and Spy.

The Spy Cave, among the most significant Paleolithic sites in Europe, is located in the municipality. The medieval Balâtre Castle is in the village of Balâtre, and Mielmont Castle is in Onoz.

See also
 List of protected heritage sites in Jemeppe-sur-Sambre

References

External links
 
 

Municipalities of Namur (province)